Plant and Soil is a monthly peer-reviewed scientific journal covering research on the relationships between plants and soil, such as relationships and interactions of plants with minerals, water and microbes, the anatomy and morphology of roots, soil biology and ecology, etc. It is published by Springer Science+Business Media on behalf of the Royal Netherlands Society of Agricultural Science (Koninklijke Landbouwkundige Vereniging). 

The editor-in-chief is Hans Lambers (The University of Western Australia and China Agricultural University). According to the Journal Citation Reports, the journal has a 2020 impact factor of 4.192. The journal is indexed in Scopus and SCImago.

References

External links

 Koninklijke Landbouwkundige Vereniging

Agricultural journals
Soil science journals
English-language journals
Publications established in 1948
Monthly journals
Springer Science+Business Media academic journals